Clarey is a surname. Notable people with the surname include:

Alec Clarey (born 1994), English rugby union player
Bernard A. Clarey (1912–1996), admiral of the United States Navy
Doug Clarey (born 1954), Major League Baseball infielder
Percy Clarey (1890–1960), Australian trade union leader and politician

See also
Admiral Clarey Bridge, automobile bridge providing access to Ford Island, a US Navy installation  in the middle of Pearl Harbor
Clary (surname)